Edward Thurlow, 1st Baron Thurlow, PC, KC (9 December 1731 – 12 September 1806), was a British lawyer and Tory politician who sat in the House of Commons from 1765 to 1778 when he was raised to the peerage as Baron Thurlow. He served as Lord High Chancellor of Great Britain for fourteen years and under four Prime Ministers.

Early life 
Born at Bracon Ash, Norfolk, Thurlow was the eldest son of Reverend Thomas Thurlow. Thomas Thurlow, Bishop of Durham, was his brother. He studied at King's School, Canterbury and at Caius College, Cambridge. However, he was forced to leave Cambridge in 1751 without a degree after coming into conflict with the authorities of the university. He was for some time articled to a solicitor in Lincoln's Inn, but in 1754 he was called to the Bar, Inner Temple. After a slow start, Thurlow eventually established a successful legal practice. He was made a King's Counsel in 1761 and was elected a bencher of the Inner Temple in 1762.

Political career 

Thurlow then turned to politics, and in 1768 he was elected Member of Parliament for Tamworth as a Tory. Two years later, as a recognition of his defence the previous January of the expulsion of John Wilkes he was appointed Solicitor-General in the government of Lord North. He held this post until 1772, when he was promoted to Attorney General. He was to remain in this office for six years, during which period he became known as an ardent opponent of the American colonists' strive for independence.  He is noted for his defeat in the case of Woodfall, who was publisher of the Letters of Junius, upon which a verdict of mistrial was entered by Lord Mansfield.

In 1778 Thurlow was admitted to the Privy Council, raised to the peerage as Baron Thurlow, of Ashfield in the County of Suffolk, and appointed Lord Chancellor by Lord North, taking his seat on 14 July 1778. In this post he notably opposed the economical and constitutional reforms proposed by Edmund Burke and John Dunning. The Tory administration of Lord North fell in March 1782, after twelve years in office. The Whigs under Lord Rockingham came to power, but Thurlow managed to cling on as Lord Chancellor. Rockingham died in July 1782, but Thurlow remained Lord Chancellor also when Lord Shelburne became Prime Minister. The latter government fell in April 1783, when a coalition government under Charles James Fox and Lord North was formed (with the Duke of Portland as titular Prime Minister). Thurlow was not invited to resume the role of Lord Chancellor, and instead the Great Seal was put into commission. He went into opposition and contributed to the downfall of the coalition in December 1783. William Pitt the Younger became Prime Minister and reinstated Thurlow as Lord Chancellor. The relationship between Pitt and Thurlow was always fragile, and Thurlow often relied on his friendship with King George III to be able to remain in office. He opposed a bill for the restoration to the heirs of estates forfeited in the Jacobite rising of 1745. Partly to please the king, he consistently and strongly supported Warren Hastings, and negotiated with the Whigs to ensure his continued power in the event of a change of government. In 1792, when he attacked Pitt's bill to establish a fund to redeem the national debt, he was finally dismissed.

Personal life
Thurlow had a number of illegitimate children Two of his daughters, Maria and Catharine, had their portrait painted by George Romney in 1783. Maria, who died in 1816, married Colonel Sir David Cunynghame of Milncraig, 5th Baronet, in 1801, and had several children. Catharine, who died in 1826, married Alexander Fraser, 17th Lord Saltoun, in 1815.

Later life

As a way of compensation, Thurlow was given a second peerage as Baron Thurlow, of Thurlow in the County of Suffolk, with remainder to his three nephews and their heirs male. He was never to hold office again and retired into private life. However, in 1797 he intrigued for the formation of a government from which Pitt and Fox should be excluded, and in which the Earl of Moira should be Prime Minister and himself Lord Chancellor. Despite the tacit support of the Prince of Wales the enterprise failed. His last recorded appearance in the House of Lords was in 1802.

Lord Thurlow never married, but left three natural daughters. He died at Brighton on 12 September 1806, aged 76, and was buried in the Temple Church. The barony of 1778 became extinct on his death, while he was succeeded in the barony of 1792 according to the special remainder by his nephew Edward, who was the eldest son of the first baron's brother, Right Reverend Thomas Thurlow, Bishop of Durham.

In popular culture
Thurlow appears as a character in Alan Bennett's play The Madness of George III and the subsequent film adaptation, in which he was played by John Wood.

John Poynder's Literary Extracts (1844) attributes to Thurlow the following widely quoted saying:

See also
Honora Jenkins' will

References

Bibliography

 Endnotes:
 Lord Campbell's Lives of the Chancellors, vii. 153–333
 Foss's Judges of England, viii. 374–385
 Public Characters (1798)
 Notes and Queries, 2nd series, vol. iii. p. 283; 3rd series, vol. iii. p. 122
 Reports of his decisions by Brown, Dickens and Vesey (jun.)
 Brougham's Statesmen of the Time of George III.

External links

|-

1731 births
1806 deaths
People educated at The King's School, Canterbury
Alumni of Gonville and Caius College, Cambridge
English lawyers
Solicitors General for England and Wales
Attorneys General for England and Wales
Lord chancellors of Great Britain
Lord High Stewards
Members of the Privy Council of Great Britain
English King's Counsel
17th-century King's Counsel
Peers of Great Britain created by George III
Members of the Parliament of Great Britain for English constituencies
British MPs 1761–1768
British MPs 1768–1774
British MPs 1774–1780
Edward 1